The 2020 Copa do Brasil third round was the third round of the 2020 Copa do Brasil. It was played from 10 March to 27 August 2020. A total of 20 teams competed in the third round to decide ten places in the fourth round of the 2020 Copa do Brasil.

On 15 March 2020, CBF suspended the competition indefinitely due to the COVID-19 pandemic. Four months later, on 9 July 2020, they announced that the third round would be resumed behind closed doors on 26 August 2020.

Format
In the third round, each tie was played on a home-and-away two-legged basis. If the aggregate score was level, the second-leg match would go straight to the penalty shoot-out to determine the winner. Host teams were settled in a draw held on 5 March 2020, 15:00 at CBF headquarters in Rio de Janeiro.

Matches
All times are Brasília time, BRT (UTC−3)

|}

Match 61

Tied 2–2 on aggregate, Juventude won on penalties and advanced to the fourth round.

Match 62

Botafogo won 3–1 on aggregate and advanced to the fourth round.

Match 63

Brusque won 2–0 on aggregate and advanced to the fourth round.

Match 64

CRB won 3–1 on aggregate and advanced to the fourth round.

Match 65

Fluminense won 3–1 on aggregate and advanced to the fourth round.

Match 66

Atlético Goianiense won 2–1 on aggregate and advanced to the fourth round.

Match 67

Ceará won 5–3 on aggregate and advanced to the fourth round.

Match 68

Ponte Preta won 5–0 on aggregate and advanced to the fourth round.

Match 69

Tied 2–2 on aggregate, Vasco da Gama won on penalties and advanced to the fourth round.

Match 70

América Mineiro won 1–0 on aggregate and advanced to the fourth round.

References

2020 Copa do Brasil
Association football events postponed due to the COVID-19 pandemic